David Somerville is the name of:

 David Somerville (judoka) (born 1974), Scottish judoka
 David Somerville (bishop) (1915–2011), Anglican bishop in Canada
 Dave Somerville (1933–2015), Canadian singer